The 2013–14 Brisbane Roar season was Roar's ninth season in the A-League. Having arguably fallen from their mantle of being the best team in the country, the Roar were striving to get back to title winning ways by any means necessary. The failure to qualify for the AFC Champions League was seen as an advantage, allowing the club to focus on domestic competition without the distraction of foreign competition. Manager Mike Mulvey was also looking to make his mark on the club during his first full pre season at the club and prove his credentials to the country in the new season.

Squad lineup for 2013/14 
Correct as of 13 February 2014 – players numbers as per the official Brisbane Roar website

 

Successful Trialists
  Dimitri Petratos – Free agent
  Diogo Ferreira – Free agent
  Jai Ingham –  Olympic FC
  Jean Carlos Solórzano – Free agent

Unsuccessful Trialists
  James Keatings –  Celtic
  Nicolas Bechar –  Sunshine Coast
  Chris Lucas –  Palm Beach Sharks
  Jarrod Kyle –  Palm Beach Sharks
  Antonio Murray –  Brisbane City
  Matt Thompson – Free agent
  Aryn Williams – Free agent
  Panny Nikas –  Sutherland Sharks
  Jamie Young – Free agent
  Kado Aoci –  Brisbane Wolves
  Kaz Patafta – Free agent

Transfers and Contracts

New Contracts

Senior Team

In

Out

Youth Team

In

Out

Competitions

Overall

A-League

Preseason

Regular season

Finals Series

Statistics

Results summary

Ladder

Results and position per round

Squad statistics

Squad and statistics accurate as of 4 May 201490 Minutes played is counted as a full game. Injury Time is not counted. A sub's appearance is counted up to the 90th minute as well. If a substitution is made during extra time, it is counted as a full game (90mins) to the player that started. The substitute is credited with the number of minutes made up from 30 seconds for every substitution in the game by both teams combined. If there is an uneven number of substitutions made in total, the number of minutes is rounded up to the following number (2.5 mins = 3 mins).If a shot is taken by a player but then saved by the goalkeeper before a follow up shot scores a goal, the player/s that took the shot before the save is/are NOT credited with an assistIf a Finals game goes to Extra Time and a substitution is made, per the original rule, only the 30 minutes (2x 15-minute halves) is counted, NOT injury time. If the referee adds injury to either half and a substitution IS made during injury time, it also reverts to the original rule (2.5 mins = 3 mins)
A-League Games played: 27
Finals Games played: 2
  Player has departed the club mid season
  Player has joined the club mid season
  Player has been injured before or during the season and in turn, has ended their season. For a player to be coloured, they need to miss 6 games before the end of the season (including finals)

 [1] – Corey Brown replaced Liam Miller in the 90th minute vs Central Coast Mariners FC in (Rnd 17). 5 substitutions were made in total (3mins) 
 [2] – Steven Lustica replaced Dimitri Petratos in the 90th minute vs Western Sydney Wanderers FC in (Rnd 18). 5 substitutions were made in total (3mins) 
 [3] – Steven Lustica replaced Liam Miller in the 90th minute vs Melbourne Victory FC in (semi-final). 4 substitutions were made in total (2mins) 
 [4] – Despite the regular time of a match being 90 minutes, the Grand Final went to Extra Time, an additional 30 minutes. In total, this equates, in the finals columns, 120 minutes (90mins + 30mins = 120mins). This note is only added to those players who featured in the Grand Final

Disciplinary Record
Correct as of 4 May 2014Red card column denotes players who were sent off after receiving a straight red card. The two yellow cards column denotes players who were sent off after receiving two yellow cards.

League Goalscorers per Round
Correct as of 4 May 2014.

    
    
    
    
    
    
    
[1] Kwame Yeboah left the club following the Round 12 fixture against Sydney FC.

Home Attendance
The two attendance figures in BOLD signals the highest attendances for both the regular season and overall highest attendance

League attendance and average includes Finals Series

See also
 Brisbane Roar FC records and statistics
 List of Brisbane Roar FC players
 Brisbane Roar end of season awards
 Brisbane Roar website 
 A-League website
 National Youth League website

Awards
 Player of the Week (Round 2) – Thomas Broich
 Player of the Week (Round 12) – Dimitri Petratos
 Player of the Week (Round 16) – Luke Brattan
 Player of the Week (Round 17) – Thomas Broich
 NAB Young Footballer of the Month (January) – Dimitri Petratos

References

Brisbane Roar FC seasons
2013–14 A-League season by team